Opening Day is the day on which professional baseball leagues begin their regular season. For Major League Baseball (MLB) and most of the American minor leagues, this day typically falls during the first week of April, although in recent years it has occasionally fallen in the last week of March. In Nippon Professional Baseball, this day typically falls during the last week of March.

For baseball fans, Opening Day serves as a symbol of rebirth; writer Thomas Boswell once penned a book titled, Why Time Begins on Opening Day. Many feel that the occasion is a moment to forget last season, in that all teams begin anew with  records. Pre-season exhibition games are usually played in the month before Opening Day, during spring training. A home opener is a team's first game of the season on their home field.

Equivalents to Opening Day occur throughout the sport, including minor leagues, college baseball, high school, and youth leagues. Because MLB generally begins its season earlier than the other professional baseball leagues, its Opening Day is the one most commonly recognized by the general public. Most minor leagues start a few days later, but within the same week; the short season Class A and Rookie leagues are exceptions, as they begin in June. College, high school and youth baseball seasons vary widely depending on location and weather conditions.

History

For generations, Opening Day has arrived amid pageantry. In Cincinnati, home of the sport's first openly all-professional team, the annual Findlay Market Parade marks an official "city holiday" with young and old alike taking the day off to cheer on the Reds. For decades, the first pitch of every major league season officially took place in Cincinnati, and the Reds remain the only major league team to always open the season with a home game (the sole exceptions, since the beginning of the 20th century, being in 1966, when they started the season at Philadelphia after rain washed out the opening series in Cincinnati; 1990, when due to a lockout affecting the schedule they opened the season at Houston; and 2022, when another lockout led to their opening the season at Atlanta). The Chicago Cubs have been the Reds' most frequent Opening Day opponent, visiting Cincinnati for 36 season openers, most recently in 2007. The Pittsburgh Pirates, against whom the current Reds organization played their first opener in 1882, are a close second with 32, most recently in 2019 and are scheduled to open in Cincinnati again in 2023; no other team has more than 19 (by the St. Louis Cardinals, most recently in 2014), largely due to the Cubs and Pirates rotating as the Opening Day opponents from 1899 to 1916, then the two teams and the Cardinals rotated from 1917 to 1952. Following the then-Boston Braves relocation to Milwaukee during the 1953 spring training, the Braves swapped schedules with the Pirates and the Opening Day opponent for the Reds began to be rotated amongst the rest of the National League. Fittingly, the Reds were also the first team to host an Interleague game on Opening Day when the team hosted the Los Angeles Angels of Anaheim in the first year of year-round Interleague play in 2013.

Since 1994 ESPN has often televised a regular-season game the night before "Opening Day" and recent years have seen the staging of season-opening series in Mexico, Puerto Rico, Japan, and Australia. While these are technically "opening games", Major League Baseball still reserves the title "Opening Day" for the first day in which multiple games are played. (For the first time ever, three televised games were played on Sunday, April 3, 2016, before the traditional "Opening Day" slate of games on Monday, April 4.)

Opening Day is a state of mind as well, with countless baseball fans known to recognize this unofficial holiday as a good reason to call in sick at work or be truant from school (as most teams typically play their home opener on a weekday afternoon) and go out to the ballpark for the first of 162 regular season games. Teams' home openers serve as the only regular season games during the year in which the entire rosters of both teams as well as coaches and clubhouse staff are introduced to the crowd prior to the games; for the rest of the year, ballparks only introduce the starting lineups and the teams' managers. Some teams, among them the New York Mets, have had their broadcasters as the master of pre-game ceremonies for their home openers, which also typically feature appearances by retired players, local celebrities or media personalities, politicians, and other dignitaries.

Prior to Opening Day, the teams' managers have to decide the starting pitchers for the game, an assignment typically given to the ace of each team's staff. For a pitcher to start on Opening Day is considered an honor, regardless of whether they are on the home or visiting team. Hall of Fame pitcher Early Wynn, who played for the Washington Senators, Cleveland Indians and Chicago White Sox, once said: "An opener is not like any other game. There's that little extra excitement, a faster beating of the heart. You have that anxiety to get off to a good start, for yourself and for the team. You know that when you win the first one, you can't lose 'em all."

In 2014, Ozzie Smith, with the support of Anheuser-Busch, began a campaign using the We the People site on WhiteHouse.gov to petition the U.S. government to make Opening Day an official national holiday.

Memorable moments

In 1907, the New York Giants forfeited their game at the Polo Grounds to the Philadelphia Phillies, 9–0, after rowdy fans made and threw snowballs. Without police available to restore order, umpire Bill Klem awarded the game to the Phillies.

In 1940, Cleveland Indians pitcher Bob Feller threw a no-hitter to open the season against the Chicago White Sox. It remains the only no-hitter in Opening Day history.

Twelve U.S. Presidents have thrown the ceremonial first pitch of the season. On April 14, 1910, baseball enthusiast William Howard Taft attended the Washington Senators' home opener at National Park, becoming the first U.S. President to open the season in this manner. Harry S. Truman threw first pitches with both his right and left arm in 1950. On April 4, 1994, Bill Clinton inaugurated the Cleveland Indians' new ballpark, then known as Jacobs Field and now as Progressive Field, with the first pitch. George W. Bush did the honors to inaugurate Nationals Park for the Washington Nationals on March 30, 2008.

Ted Williams was a .449 hitter in openers, with three home runs and fourteen runs batted in during fourteen such games and at least one hit in each game.

On April 4, 1974, Hank Aaron of the Atlanta Braves hit his 714th career home run on Opening Day at Cincinnati's Riverfront Stadium, tying Babe Ruth on Major League Baseball's all-time list. Aaron finished his career with 755 home runs.

In 14 season openers for the Washington Senators, Walter Johnson pitched a record nine shutouts. Two of his more famous starts include a 3–0 victory over the Philadelphia Athletics in 1910 and a 1–0 marathon victory while battling the A's Eddie Rommel for 15 innings.

On March 29, 2018, Matt Davidson of the Chicago White Sox hit three home runs in his team's opener against the Kansas City Royals at Kansas City's Kauffman Stadium. He became the fourth major leaguer with three home runs on Opening Day, following the Toronto Blue Jays' George Bell in 1988, Chicago Cubs' Tuffy Rhodes in 1994 and the Detroit Tigers' Dmitri Young in 2005.

The St. Louis Cardinals were the first major league team to open their home season with a night game, beating the Pittsburgh Pirates 4–2 at Sportsman's Park on April 18, 1950.

The first interleague Opening Day game was played between the Los Angeles Angels of Anaheim (AL) and the Cincinnati Reds (NL) on April 1, 2013 at Cincinnati's Great American Ball Park. The Angels won the game in 13 innings, 3–1.

The longest Opening Day game in major league history was played on April 5, 2012 between the Cleveland Indians and Toronto Blue Jays. The game, played at Cleveland's Progressive Field, ended with the Blue Jays beating the Indians, 7–4, in 16 innings. The previous record for longest Opening Day game was on April 19, 1960, at Cleveland Stadium. That game, lasting 15 innings, also saw the Indians in a losing effort, 4–2, versus the Detroit Tigers. The Philadelphia Athletics and Washington Senators also played a 15-inning season opener on April 13, 1926, with Washington winning, 1–0, at home.

On rare occasions, predominantly in the early 20th century, a team would open its home season with a doubleheader. The first of these came when the Boston Americans hosted the Philadelphia Athletics for two games on April 20, 1903, with Boston winning the first game, 9–4, and Philadelphia taking the second game, 10–7. The most recent Opening Day doubleheader in the major leagues came on April 7, 1971, with the Chicago White Sox defeating the host Oakland Athletics in both games (6–5 and 12–4, respectively).

In 1968, Greg Washburn, a pitcher in the California Angels organization, pitched two Opening Day games in the same year—first for the San Jose Bees of the California League, and then for the Quad City Angels of the Midwest League. Washburn won both openers 2–0. This is the only record of a pitcher pitching two openers in the same year in professional baseball.

Hall of Famer Tom Seaver holds the record among major league pitchers for the most Opening Day starts, doing the honors 16 times in his career with the New York Mets, Cincinnati Reds, and Chicago White Sox.

The record for most consecutive victories on Opening Day by a team in history is ten, shared by the Boston Beaneaters (1887–1896) and the Houston Astros (2011–present).

Recent Opening Days
Major League Baseball had most of its teams open the 2011 season on a Thursday (March 31) or Friday (April 1) rather than the traditional Monday, in order to prevent the World Series from extending into November. Similarly, most teams opened the 2012 season on Thursday (April 5) or Friday (April 6). However, subsequent seasons through 2017 returned to Monday openers for most teams. For the 2018 season, all 30 teams were scheduled to open the season on Thursday, March 29 (the earliest domestic start for a regular season in MLB history, and the first time since 1968 that all major league teams were scheduled to start the season on the same day, although two games were subsequently rained out and postponed to Friday, March 30). In 2019, MLB scheduled an even earlier opening day for most teams on Thursday, March 28; this excludes a two-game series on March 20 and 21 between the Seattle Mariners and Oakland A's at the Tokyo Dome in Japan. The opening of the 2020 season was originally scheduled for Thursday, March 26, but was rescheduled to Thursday, July 23 and Friday, July 24 due to the COVID-19 pandemic. The 2021 season opened on Thursday, April 1. The opening of the 2022 season, originally scheduled for Thursday, March 31, was delayed to Thursday, April 7 due to the 2021–22 lockout.
The 2023 Major League Baseball season opens on March 30.

International Opening Games

Quotes

References

External links

 Opening Day by the National Baseball Hall of Fame and Museum
 Important Dates by MLB.com
 Cincinnati Eager for Opening Day by MLB.com
 Opening Day Through the Years – slideshow by Life magazine

April observances
Major League Baseball culture
Major League Baseball competitions
Unofficial observances
Annual events in Major League Baseball